Paluma is a town in the City of Townsville and a locality split between the City of Townsville and the Charters Towers Region in Queensland, Australia.

It is in the Mount Spec Ranges and is the southernmost point of Townsville's heritage-listed Wet Tropics.

Geography 
The residential land use is mostly within the town.The remaining  to the west in the Charters Towers Region has a mix of uses including grazing on native vegetation, the Paluma Range National Park, the Paluma State Forest, and the Mount Zero Taravale Private Nature Reserve (operated by the Australian Wildlife Conservancy).

The now-closed Greenvale railway line passed through the locality which was served by the now-abandoned Girrinjah railway station.

Paluma has the following mountains:

 Black Hill 
 Krugers Hill
 Mount Bitalli
 Mount Bradley 
 Mount Brown 
 Mount Foxton 
 Mount Julia 
 Mount Moss
 Mount Nokomis 
 Mount Podge 
 Mount Ryan 
 Mount Spectacle 
 Mount Zero 
 Pinnacle
 Powell Knob 
 Snake Hill
 Sugarloaf 
 Trial Hill 
 Twin Hills 
 Willett Knob

History 
The area was originally known as Cloudy Clearing until it was renamed Paluma in 1934.

It developed from a mining and forestry background. The first people to arrive here were tin prospectors in the 1870s after an abundance of tin in the mountains. The area remained isolated until a road was built up the range in the 1930s. This industry lasted for years until landowners worked together to shut it down. The tin industry was using the creeks for washing the tin; however, this was incompatible with using the creeks for Paluma's water supply.

Running River Provisional School opened in 1946 but closed on 31 December 1949. The school re-opened on 2 February 1954 but closed on 21 June 1963. It re-opened on 23 January 1965 and closed on 10 April 1974. It subsequently re-opened and closed permanently on 16 December 1994. It was at 28 Furber Road (also known as Breakaway Road and Ewan Road); it was a  site with a frontage onto Running River.

Paluma Temporary School opened on 28 September 1950, becoming Paluma State School in 1952. The school closed on 19 July 1968 due to falling enrolments.

The Paluma Environmental Education Centre was established in 1977 by the Queensland Department of Education on the site of Paluma State School.

Heritage listings 
The Mount Spec Road and Little Crystal Creek Bridge is a heritage-listed road with stone-faced arch bridge in the Mount Spec Ranges built in 1933. It is the only arch road bridge that remains in service in Queensland. Crystal clear water flows down the creek filling the deep pools of Little Crystal Creek, making it an excellent natural swimming hole. It is listed on the Queensland Heritage Register.

Education 
Paluma Environmental Education Centre is an Outdoor and Environmental Education Centre at 53 Mt Spec Road. The school provides students from years 1 to 12 the opportunity to engage with the natural environment with one of the classrooms built underneath the canopy of the forest.

There are no mainstream schools in Paluma. The nearest government primary schools are Mutarnee State School in Mutarnee to the north-east of the town of Paluma and Mount Fox State School in neighbouring Mount Fox to the north-west. The nearest government secondary school is Ingham State High School in Ingham to the north. However, much of this large locality is too distant from these schools and the options would be distance education or boarding schools.

See also

 Paluma Dam

References

Further reading

External links 

 

Suburbs of Townsville
Tourist attractions in Queensland
Charters Towers Region
Localities in Queensland
Mining towns in Queensland